Mills Hill railway station is in the Mills Hill area of Middleton in the Metropolitan Borough of Rochdale, in Greater Manchester, England. The station is 5¾ miles (9 km) north of Manchester Victoria on the Caldervale Line. Mills Hill lies on Middleton's common boundary with Chadderton, and thus serves both communities.

During the temporary closure of the Oldham Loop line for its conversion to Metrolink light rail (2009–12) the station acted as an informal railhead for much of the borough of Oldham.

With an annual patronage of 314,000 entries and exits per year Mills Hill station is the second busiest unstaffed railway station within Transport for Greater Manchester's area. It is due to this fact that TfGM are pushing for funding to be made available to improve accessibility at the station for disabled passengers. The station is second only to Greenfield Railway Station on the prioritized list for this funding.

History

The original station opened on 4 July 1839 before the completion of the branches to Middleton and Oldham, and closed on 11 August 1842 when these were opened. The current station opened on 25 March 1985 by British Rail at the same point as the original.

Services
Since the May 2018 timetable change, the service pattern here has been completely revamped (though the half-hourly basic frequency remains unaltered). All trains (apart from a small number of weekday peak and late evening workings) run to/from Rochdale only, with passengers for destinations further north having to change there.

On Sundays, an hourly service operates with trains running to  via  southbound and to Blackburn via Todmorden and  northbound.

As part of the Great North Rail Project by Network Rail a ramp and lift will be installed for disabled access to the station.

Notes

References
The Manchester and Leeds Railway by Martin Bairstow

External links

Railway stations in the Metropolitan Borough of Rochdale
DfT Category F1 stations
Former Lancashire and Yorkshire Railway stations
Railway stations in Great Britain opened in 1839
Railway stations in Great Britain closed in 1842
Railway stations opened by British Rail
Railway stations in Great Britain opened in 1985
Northern franchise railway stations
Middleton, Greater Manchester